The 1927–28 Panhellenic Championship was the first season of the highest football league of Greece. It was held with the participation of 3 teams, the champions of the founding Associations of the HFF, Athens, Piraeus and Macedonia, in which Atromitos, Ethnikos Piraeus and Aris respectively finished first. At the beginning of the season, the HFF punished Olympiacos and forbade them from taking part in the Piraeus' championship and consequently in the Panhellenic championship. He also forced the other clubs not to play with them even in friendly matches. However, the strong teams of Athens, Panathinaikos, AEK Athens and Apollon Athens, expected financial income from the various tournaments they organized with the participation of Olympiacos. On October 31, 1927, the HFF expelled the illegal clubs and banned them from participating in the championship. As a result, the 3 biggest clubs created a partnership called POK, from the initials of the words: Podosferikós Ómilos Kéntrou (Football Central Clubs) or from the initials of the names of the three clubs: "Panathinaikos"-"Olympiacos"-"Konstantinoupόleos". In February 1928, Apollon Athens joined the alliance, with the press calling it "POKA". The non-participation of these clubs weakened the championship, as the fans preferred the international friendlies of the strong clubs and the tournaments that have been established since then during the holidays. The devaluation of the leagues forced the HFF the following July 1928 to revoke their dismissals and from the next season the clubs returned to the leagues normally. Aris eventually won the championship. The point system was: Win: 2 points - Draw: 1 point - Loss: 0 points.

Qualification round

Athens Football Clubs Association
After the departure of Panathinaikos and AEK Athens, only 5 clubs participated, Atromitos, Goudi, Athinaikos, Armeniki Enosis and Aias Athens. They played qualifying and final matches, without being clear exactly the system that was applied. The only thing that is certain is that after the qualifiers, Goudi and Atromitos qualified for the final.

|+Summary

|}

Piraeus Football Clubs Association
The system of conduct is not clear, but it is known that a final match was held in May 1928, between the Ethnikos Piraeus and the Amyna Kokkinia, who seem to have been the only clubs in the league, after the punishment and non-participation of Olympiacos. The final was held on Sunday, May 13 1928, at the Neo Phaliron Velodrome, where and while Ethnikos Piraeus was leading 4-1, the players of Amyna Kokkinia, not accepting the defeat, made incidents and as a result the match was interrupted. The Piraeus Association stopped definitively the final and declared Ethnikos Piraeus the champion.

Macedonia Football Clubs Association

Final round

League table

Top scorers

References

External links
Rsssf 1927–28 championship

Panhellenic Championship seasons
Greece
1927–28 in Greek football